Rachtman is a surname. Notable people with the surname include:

Karyn Rachtman (born 1964), American music supervisor and film producer
Riki Rachtman (born 1965), American television and radio personality